Fosciandora is a comune (municipality) of 670 inhabitants in the Province of Lucca in the Italian region Tuscany, located about  northwest of Florence and about  north of Lucca.

Fosciandora borders the following municipalities: Barga, Castelnuovo di Garfagnana, Gallicano, Pieve Fosciana, Pievepelago. It was annexed by Lucca in the thirteenth century.

Gallery

References

Cities and towns in Tuscany